Fiery Cushman is a professor of psychology at Harvard University, where he directs the Moral Psychology Research Laboratory. He is John L. Loeb Professor of the Social Sciences.

He received his BA and PhD from Harvard University, and previously taught at Brown University.

Personal life
Cushman's father was a Washington correspondent for the New York Times, and his mother taught psychology at American University. He married Julia Kobick in 2007. They have one daughter.

References

External links

 Psychology Department webpage
 Moral Psychology Research Lab

Harvard University faculty
Harvard University alumni
American moral psychologists
Year of birth missing (living people)
Living people